Peeks Creek is a stream located in Macon County, North Carolina.  It is a tributary of the Cullasaja River, into which it flows a few miles or kilometers upstream of Franklin.

In September 2004, it had a catastrophic flood and mudslide, after massive rains left over from Hurricane Ivan struck the same area soaked by former Hurricane Frances a week before. The slide started on Fishhawk Mountain (also called Big Fish Hawk Mountain), where it continued into the creek. Another home was pierced by a tree from end to end, the picture appearing in a local newspaper.

The area of the slide is about two miles (3 km) or three kilometers long, with much of the mud and some of the smaller debris continuing into and down the Cullasaja.

The unincorporated community of Peeks Creek was devastated by the historic event, with at least five people killed.

References

Bodies of water of Macon County, North Carolina
Rivers of North Carolina